La Salsa is a chain of fast-casual Tex Mex restaurants founded in Los Angeles in 1979 and headquartered in Scottsdale, Arizona and is owned by Canadian franchisor MTY Food Group.  The chain emphasizes fresh ingredients, and each restaurant features a self-serve salsa bar.

La Salsa has been closely associated with its sister company Baja Fresh, which purchased the company from CKE Restaurants in 2007. Since then, the companies have shared their corporate headquarters.

In 2016, MTY acquired La Salsa with its sister company Baja Fresh and is current being managed by MTYs Kahala Brands division. The chain operated 23 restaurants in the United States, most of which are franchised.

History
The opening of La Salsa in 1979 predated the opening of similar chains such as Chipotle (1993), Baja Fresh (1990), and Qdoba (1995).

The La Salsa restaurant chain was founded in 1979 by Howdy Kabrins as a single location at the corner of Pico and Sepulveda boulevards in West Los Angeles. By 1986, there were six locations, all within Los Angeles County.

The first mentioned of La Salsa being in Orange County was in an article that showed that La Salsa was at the MainPlace Mall in Santa Ana when the mall first opened in August 1986.

The first San Diego area location was opened in Horton Plaza in August 1985.

After expanding the La Salsa chain throughout Southern California, Kabrins sold control of the company to a consortium that included Sienna Holding and InterWest Partners in June 1992.

La Salsa opened their first Northern California location, the 38th in the chain, in Sacramento in 1993.

In July 1999, Santa Barbara Restaurant Group acquired La Salsa via a stock swap. At the time of the acquisition, La Salsa had 98 locations throughout the United States, 48 of which were franchised.

CKE Restaurants obtained La Salsa in March 2002 when it acquired its then parent company, Santa Barbara Restaurant Group.

Baja Fresh
In 2007, CKE Restaurants sold La Salsa to Baja Fresh for an undisclosed amount. At the time of the sale, La Salsa had over 100 locations in approximately a dozen states.

In September 2016, it was announced that Baja Fresh's parent, BF Acquisition Holdings, was sold to MTY Food Group for $27 million. At the time of the acquisition by MTY, Baja Fresh had 162 restaurants and its sister company La Salsa had 23 restaurant; 16 of the combined 185 locations were franchised. It is unclear if the new owner would combined the two chains or keep them separate. In an earlier press release announcing MTY's acquisition of Kahala Brands just two months previously, MTY gave the vague statement that "Kahala will stay in Kahala's current headquarters... while MTY's US operations will move into Kahala's offices".

See also
 List of Tex-Mex restaurants

References

External links
 

1979 establishments in California
Fast casual restaurants
Fast-food chains of the United States
Fast-food franchises
Fast-food Mexican restaurants
Mexican restaurants
Restaurants established in 1979
Tex-Mex restaurants
Companies based in Scottsdale, Arizona